Events from the year 1742 in art.

Events
 Canaletto paints in England.

Works
 François Boucher – Diana Leaving her Bath
 Canaletto
 The Porta Portello, Padua (1741–1742) (National Gallery of Art, Washington D.C.)
 Rome: The Arch of Constantine (British Royal Collection, Windsor Castle)
 Rome: The Arch of Septimius Severus (British Royal Collection, Windsor Castle)
 Rome: The Arch of Titus (British Royal Collection, Windsor Castle)
 Rome: The Pantheon (British Royal Collection, Windsor Castle)
 Rome: Ruins of the Forum looking towards the Capitol (British Royal Collection, Windsor Castle)
 William Hogarth (paintings)
 Miss Mary Edwards
 Taste in High Life (engraved in 1746)
 Vincenzo Meucci – Glory of Florentine Saints (fresco on interior of dome, basilica of San Lorenzo, Florence)
 Jacques Saly – Portrait bust of Emanuel Pinto de Fonseca, Grand Master of the Order of the Maltese Cross

Births
 February 15 – Yves-Marie Le Gouaz, French engraver (died 1816)
 April 24 – Richard Crosse, English painter of portrait miniatures (died 1810)
 July 12 – Jurriaan Andriessen, Dutch decorative painter (died 1819)
 September 8 – Ozias Humphrey, English painter of portrait miniatures (died 1810)
 September 26 – Thomas Jones, Welsh artist of watercolours and sketches (died 1803)
 November 5 – Richard Cosway, British miniaturist (died 1821)
 date unknown
 John Edwards, English botanist, painter, designer and illustrator (died 1815)
 Kim Eung-hwan, Korean painter of the late Joseon period (died 1789)
 John Kay, caricaturist (died 1826)

Deaths
 March 13 – Gilles-Marie Oppenordt, French designer (born 1672)
 June 9 – Simone Brentana, Italian painter, active in Verona (born 1656)
 July 19 – Jan Baptist Xavery, Flemish sculptor active in the Netherlands (born 1697)
 December 3 – Claude Aubriet, illustrator and botanical artist (born 1651)
 date unknown – Faustino Bocchi, Italian painter, active in Brescia, who specialized in bizarre paintings of dwarfs (born 1659)
 probable – Eleazar Albin, naturalist and illustrator

 
Years of the 18th century in art
1740s in art